Zynhary is a hamlet in the Halaç District of the Lebap Province of Turkmenistan.

Etymology 
The place is named after a local Turkmen poet, Abdirahim Zynhary (1791–1880).

Site 
The Aly Isha Madrasah—where Zynhary had studied—is a tourist attraction.

References 

Populated places in Lebap Region